Giulio Ciotti (born 5 October 1976 in Rimini) is an Italian high jumper. He is the twin brother of Nicola Ciotti.

Biography
He won the silver medal from the 2001 Mediterranean Games, finished seventh at the 2006 World Indoor Championships and tenth at the 2006 European Championships. He also competed at the 2002 European Championships, but without reaching the final.

Ciotti became Italian high jump champion in 2001, 2002 and 2006, besting Nicola Ciotti, Andrea Bettinelli, and Alessandro Talotti in those campaigns. He also became indoor champion in 1999 and 2001.

His personal best jump is 2.31 metres, achieved in July 2006 in Viersen and equalled in July 2009 in Formia.

Achievements

National titles
He has won 5 times the individual national championship.
3 wins in High jump (2001, 2002, 2006)
2 wins in High jump indoor (1999, 2001)

See also
Italian all-time top lists - High jump

References

External links
 

1976 births
Living people
Sportspeople from Rimini
Italian male high jumpers
Italian twins
Twin sportspeople
Mediterranean Games silver medalists for Italy
Athletes (track and field) at the 2001 Mediterranean Games
World Athletics Championships athletes for Italy
Mediterranean Games medalists in athletics
20th-century Italian people
21st-century Italian people